LearnHub was a social learning network for international education run by Savvica Inc., an online learning company based in Toronto, Ontario, Canada.  The website was launched in 2008 to help Indian students find higher education opportunities primarily in the US, the UK and Canada. The website was shut down in 2013 following closure of the company's Toronto headquarters. The site offered test preparation tools, a university program directory, student counselling and a career network. In May 2010, LearnHub became the 30th most visited website in India. In June 2011 Learnhub was 13th most visited site in India and the most popular education website in India. This success was highly cyclical and was a result of the traffic spikes in May/June when Indian students were using the vast free test prep database housed on the site. As of December 2012, LearnHub closed its Toronto office and stopped updating its website, Twitter and Facebook pages, suggesting that the company was no longer operating. In April 2013, Top Hat Monocle announced that LearnHub co-founder and former CEO Malgosia Green became the company's new Chief Product Officer.

Social learning network
LearnHub was a social learning network which used Web 2.0 to allow international students to form discussions concerning higher education and studying abroad. It was designed to allow people to share learning and knowledge in online communities.

Test preparation
LearnHub offered free access to IIT-JEE, BITSAT, AIEEE, SAT, GMAT, GRE and TOEFL practice exams and question banks. The site included thousands of original practice test questions. Students could also check the government released results of IIT JEE on the website.

Program directory
LearnHub had a program directory with information about university and college programs from the UK, the US, Canada, India and South Korea.  These programs could be filtered by destination country, subject and education level.

University and college directory
LearnHub contained articles about universities and colleges.  These articles contained information about the location, campus, academic programs, tuition and financial aid.  LearnHub had partnered with a variety of institutions, including public and private colleges and Universities, technical institutes, research institutions, and liberal arts colleges.

United States

United Kingdom

Canada

India

South Korea

Student Counselling

LearnHub had an office in Gurgaon, Haryana, India.  LearnHub student counsellors guided students with respect to admissions, entrance exam prep, financial aid and visas for universities and colleges around the world.

Technology
LearnHub ran on an  Open-source software stack, including Ruby on Rails.

References

External links

Study abroad programs
Social search